Grouplove (often typeset as GROUPLOVE) is an American alternative rock band that was formed in 2009 by Hannah Hooper (lead vocals, keyboards), Christian Zucconi (lead vocals, rhythm guitar), Sean Gadd (bass), Andrew Wessen (lead guitar, backing vocals), and Ryan Rabin (drums).

Rabin produced their debut EP, Grouplove, which was originally released independently, and was later re-released by Canvasback/Atlantic with a bonus track and their hit song, "Colours". They are also known for their single "Tongue Tied". Their debut album, Never Trust a Happy Song, was also produced by Rabin and was released worldwide on September 13, 2011. As of 2021, Grouplove has released five studio albums and two EPs.

History

Formation (2009–10)
Grouplove formed out of a friendship among the five members of the band. Hooper met Zucconi on the Lower East Side of Manhattan after hearing music from his former band ALOKE. Despite having just met, Hooper invited Zucconi to an artist residency in Crete she was leaving for later that week.  It was at the Ikarus artist commune in the village of Avdou where they met the rest of the band, Andrew Wessen, Ryan Rabin, and Sean Gadd. Rabin, an accomplished drummer and producer, grew up in Los Angeles with Wessen, a surfer and guitarist. Rabin comes from a musical family – his father is Trevor Rabin, former guitarist of Yes. Sean Gadd, a songwriter and guitarist from London, was also at the commune. The friendship between the members formed quickly, but the band did not form until a year later after Gadd, Zucconi and Hooper pooled their funds together and made a trip to Rabin's Los Angeles recording studio. They played their first show at El Cid in Los Angeles on May 10, 2010.  Later that year, the band went on tour with Florence and the Machine on the west coast, and then the Joy Formidable on the east coast. By November, Nylon Magazine recognized Grouplove as one of the top ten in the "Best New Bands in 2010."

Before signing with Canvasback/Atlantic Records the band licensed the song "Getaway Car" to HBO's "How to Make it In America". Canvasback re-released their self-titled EP, Grouplove, on January 25, 2011.  In 2011, the band co-headlined a cross-country tour with Foster the People, and made appearances at Lollapalooza, Outside Lands, Reading and Leeds Festivals, and Glastonbury.

Never Trust a Happy Song and Spreading Rumours (2011–2016)
The band released its debut album, Never Trust a Happy Song, on September 13, 2011, through Canvasback/Atlantic Records. They released 4 singles from the album – Colours (which was featured on FIFA 12, albeit as the Captain Cuts remix), "Tongue Tied" (which went on to score the band a no. 1 on the US Alternative Chart and featured in several commercials (including one for Apple, and one for Coca-Cola) and an episode of Fox's Glee) Lovely Cup and Itchin On A Photograph.  In support of their debut album, the band went on a headlining North American Fall tour and also performed with Two Door Cinema Club as their main support.  In December, the band performed at KROQ Almost Acoustic Christmas, which takes place at the Gibson Amphitheatre, in Universal City. On January 3, 2012, the band kicked off their sold-out headline tour in Australia at the Factory Theatre in Sydney and continued their tour in Europe in February.  The band began their US Spring 2012 tour on March 6 in Burlington, Vermont in support of Young the Giant. Throughout the sold-out headline tour the band had featured stops at Coachella Valley Music and Arts Festival, Sasquatch! Music Festival, and Bonnaroo Music and Arts Festival.

Grouplove kicked off their Close Your Eyes and Count to Tour tour on September 25, 2012, at the Roseland Theater in Portland, Oregon, traveling across the country with Alt-J and MS MR as support.  Close Your Eyes and Count to Tour ended on November 17, 2012, at the Wiltern in Los Angeles, California.

On April 20, 2013, Grouplove released a "Make It To Me" in collaboration with Manchester Orchestra. They announced their second album, as well as debuting the video for the lead single, "Ways To Go", on 10 June 2013.

On September 17, 2013, Grouplove's second album, Spreading Rumours, was released. That same day, Grouplove played a sold-out show at the Troubadour in West Hollywood with supporting Australian band, the Rubens. The band then embarked on an 18-show US tour, the Seesaw Tour, on which they played in 9 cities, with two dates in each city – one a more standard show, the other a more stripped back show. They were supported on this tour by the Rubens.

In late 2013, Grouplove started touring with Daniel Gleason. This was temporary and was to allow Sean Gadd to do other work. Although rumors circulated that he left the band, he stated on Twitter that he was still part of Grouplove. Gleason then toured with the band on their 2014 US tour, on which they were supported by MS MR, and their subsequent European tour, on which they were supported by FEMME for the UK dates.

On April 22, 2014, Sean Gadd tweeted, "Thanks for all the love. Grouplove is family and still my favorite band. Sending love. GROUP", leaving his status with the band up in the air. He has posted a song on YouTube called "Dream With Me". On June 19, 2014, Sean Gadd tweeted a series of tweets about his status in the band, the last one officially confirmed his leaving of the band, "I'm so sorry I made a big mistake. I'm making an announcement of why I'm leaving grouplove forever x." This was followed by a post on the band's website officially announcing his departure.

The band played at several festivals in 2014, including Bonnaroo, Lollapalooza, Firefly and Coachella, and will headline the Honda Civic tour in late August/early September, supported by Portugal. The Man. While on tour that year, they performed a cover of Beyoncé's hit single, "Drunk In Love".

In 2014, Grouplove released I'm With You, a short form tour documentary about the band. The documentary featured performances from the New York Seesaw Tour shows and a digital album of six songs is set for release by Atlantic.

The band have contributed original songs "Let Me In", to the soundtrack for the movie The Fault In Our Stars. They also contributed an original song, "Everyone's Gonna Get High", to an episode of the second season of the HBO series Girls; and another song, "Underground", to the 2012 Tim Burton movie Frankenweenie. In 2014, they provided the end title song for the Netflix original series BoJack Horseman and the song "No Drama Queen" for Paper Towns.

Big Mess and Little Mess (2016–2019)
Grouplove released their third studio album, Big Mess, on September 9, 2016. On July 15, 2016, the band released the lead single from the album, "Welcome to Your Life". The band also announced a world tour which began in August 2016.

On April 22, 2017, Grouplove released an EP titled Little Mess. The EP was an extension of their full-length album Big Mess and it came with songs "Tell Me a Story", "Torso", "MRI", "Enlighten Me (Live)", and "Adios Amigos".

Grouplove donated $1 from every ticket sale of their 'Big Mess' world tour and raised $40,387 for charity: water. On May 9, it was confirmed that, alongside K.Flay, the band would be a supporting act for Imagine Dragons' Evolve Tour, in support of their third studio album Evolve. Noticeably, drummer Ryan Rabin was missing from the lineup on this tour, with Benjamin Homola filling in on drums. In an email to band frontman Christian Zucconi, Rabin explained, "I'm not saying I don't want to be in the band anymore but I don't want to go on the tour."

Healer and This Is This (2020-present)
On January 8, 2020, Grouplove released the single "Deleter", the band's first release since the re-release of Big Mess in 2017. A music video, directed by Chris Blauvelt, was also released, and the band revealed that "Deleter" would be the lead single off of an upcoming fourth album. The album's title was later revealed to be Healer, along with a North American tour announcement. A video for "Youth" was released two weeks prior to the album. It again teamed them with director Christopher Blauvelt and stars Grace Zabriskie, a personal friend of the band. In a press release for Healer, Benjamin Homola was listed as the band's new drummer. Ahead of the tour, the band was certified climate positive by the United Nations, the first band in the United States to gain the certification. On March 10, 2021, Grouplove released the single "Deadline" along with a music video for the song. The band also made the surprise announcement that their fifth studio album, This Is This, would be released two days later on March 12, 2021.

Chart success
Grouplove's first single, "Colours", reached number 15 on Modern Rock charts. It was also featured in Madden NFL 12, FIFA 12, and MLB 2K12. The song was also offered as a free download on iTunes for the week beginning September 12, 2011.

In November 2011, the band's second single "Tongue Tied" appeared in an iPod Touch commercial. The song steadily grew in popularity, and, after 26 consecutive weeks on the Modern Rock radio chart, hit No. 1 in June 2012. "Tongue Tied" has been RIAA certified Platinum and sold over 1,000,000 singles to date in the US, and has gone gold in Australia and Canada too. "Tongue Tied" was also used and performed by the cast of Fox's Glee in a May episode of the series, and also featured in a Coca-Cola advertisement. It also appears in the Gameloft racing game GT Racing 2: The Real Car Experience. Later it was used in the movies Blended with Adam Sandler, and Project Almanac.

In the voting for Australia's Hottest 100 presented by Triple J, "Tongue Tied" was voted #16th and "Itchin' on a Photograph" at No. 43 best songs of 2012.

The third single off of Never Trust a Happy Song, "Itchin' on a Photograph" went to top 10 at Modern Rock radio. "Itchin' on a Photograph" was featured on the NASCAR The Game: Inside Line soundtrack.

"Ways To Go" the lead single from their 2013 sophomore album Spreading Rumours, reached number 2 on Billboard's Alternative Songs chart and number 8 on the Rock Airplay chart. In 2014, "Shark Attack" went Top 20 on Alternative Songs reaching number 20.

"Welcome To Your Life", the lead single from their third LP, Big Mess, reached the Top 5 on Billboard's Alternative Songs chart at number 5.

The FIFA video game series has also featured "I'm With You" in FIFA 14 and "Don't Stop Making it Happen" in FIFA 17.

"Deleter" was featured in MLB The Show 20.

Band members 
Current members
 Christian Zucconi – lead and backing vocals, rhythm guitar (2009–present)
 Hannah Hooper – lead and backing vocals, keyboards (2009–present)
 Andrew Wessen – lead guitar, backing vocals (2009–present)
 Daniel Gleason – bass (2014–present)
 Benjamin Homola – drums (2017–present) 

Former members
 Sean Gadd – bass, backing vocals (2009–2014)
 Ryan Rabin – drums, various instruments (2009–2017)

Timeline

Discography

Studio albums

EPs 
Grouplove EP (2010), Canvasback
Little Mess EP (2017)

Record Store Day exclusive 
"Don't Fly Too Close to the Sun" 7" single (2012), Canvasback
"Manchester Orchestra with Grouplove 2013" 12" single (2013), Canvasback
"Under the Covers" 10" single (2015), Canvasback
Little Mess 12" EP (2017), Canvasback

Singles

As featured artist

Other charted songs

Other appearances

Notes

References

External links 
 

2009 establishments in California
Alternative dance musical groups
Atlantic Records artists
Indie rock musical groups from California
Musical groups established in 2009
Musical groups from Los Angeles